Byrd is an unincorporated community in Marion County, in the U.S. state of Alabama.

History
The community is named after the Byrd family, who were early settlers of the area. They also donated land for a school to be built. The school served students in grades one through nine.

References

Unincorporated communities in Marion County, Alabama
Unincorporated communities in Alabama